Şıxlar, Masally may refer to:
Şıxlar (38° 57' N 48° 34' E), Masally
Şıxlar (39° 01' N 48° 46' E), Masally